Ogden Newspapers Inc. is a Wheeling, West Virginia based publisher of daily and weekly newspapers, magazines, telephone directories, and shoppers guides. The company was founded by H.C. Ogden in 1890, and is currently run by the family of his grandson, G. Ogden Nutting. Current CEO Robert Nutting, son of G. Ogden Nutting, is the fourth generation of the Ogden-Nutting family to run the company, and is also principal owner of the Pittsburgh Pirates. It has operations in California, Florida, Hawaii, Indiana, Iowa, Kansas, Maryland, Michigan, Minnesota, New Hampshire, New York, North Dakota, Ohio, Pennsylvania, Utah, Virginia and West Virginia, serving mostly small markets, such as Cape Coral, Florida, Fort Wayne, Indiana and Lawrence, Kansas.

In October 1984, two conservative Ogden newspapers (The Intelligencer and The Evening Journal) dropped the Doonesbury comic strip because they objected to Doonesbury's coverage of Ronald Reagan.

On January 30, 2018, it emerged that the company was the apparent high bid to purchase the bankrupt Charleston Gazette-Mail. yet withdrew the bid on March 8, 2018.

On January 1, 2022, Ogden Newspapers took over Swift Communications, which has publications in Colorado, Utah, Nevada, and California.

Magazines

Kansas

Grit (magazine)Mother Earth NewsMotorcycle Classics Newspapers 

 California 
 Sierra Sun of Truckee
 Tahoe Daily Tribune of South Lake Tahoe

Colorado

 Summit Daily News of Summit County, Colorado
 Vail Daily of Vail, Colorado
 The Aspen Times and Snowmass Sun of Aspen, Colorado
 Glenwood Springs Post Independent of Glenwood Springs, Colorado
 Steamboat Pilot & Today of Steamboat Springs, Colorado
 Sky-Hi News of Winter Park, Colorado
 Craig Times of Craig, Colorado

Florida

 Cape Coral Daily Breeze of Cape Coral, Florida
 Pine Island Eagle of Bokeelia, Florida

Hawaii

 Maui News of Wailuku, Hawaii

Indiana

 Fort Wayne News Sentinel of Fort Wayne, Indiana

Iowa

 Estherville Daily News of Estherville, Iowa
 Fort Dodge Messenger of Fort Dodge, Iowa
 Marshalltown Times Republican of Marshalltown, Iowa
 Webster City Daily Freeman Journal of Webster City, Iowa

Kansas

 Lawrence Journal-World of Lawrence, Kansas

Maryland

 The Frederick News-Post of Frederick, Maryland

Michigan

 Alpena News of Alpena, Michigan
 The Daily Mining Gazette of Houghton, Michigan
 Daily Press of Escanaba, Michigan
 The Daily News of Iron Mountain, Michigan
 The Mining Journal of Marquette, Michigan

Minnesota

 Sentinel of Fairmont, Minnesota
 Marshall Independent of Marshall, Minnesota
 The Journal of New Ulm, Minnesota

New Hampshire
 The Telegraph of Nashua, New Hampshire

New York

 Adirondack Daily Enterprise of Saranac Lake, New York
 The Observer of Dunkirk, New York
 Leader Herald of Gloversville, New York (through July 31, 2021)
 Lake Placid News, a weekly of Lake Placid, New York
 The Post-Journal of Jamestown, New York

North Dakota

 Minot Daily News of Minot, North Dakota
 Pierce County Tribune of Rugby, North Dakota

Ohio

 The Courier (Findlay) of Findlay, Ohio
 Review Times of Fostoria, Ohio
 Herald-Star of Steubenville, Ohio
 Marietta Times of Marietta, Ohio
 Martins Ferry Times Leader of Martins Ferry, Ohio
 Morning Journal of Lisbon, Ohio
 Norwalk Reflector of Norwalk, Ohio
 The Review of East Liverpool, Ohio
 Salem News (Ohio) of Salem, Ohio
 Sandusky Register of Sandusky, Ohio
 Tiffin Advertiser Tribune of Tiffin, Ohio
 Warren Tribune Chronicle of Warren, Ohio
 The Vindicator of Youngstown, Ohio

Pennsylvania

 Altoona Mirror of Altoona, Pennsylvania
 Lewistown Sentinel of Lewistown, Pennsylvania
 Lock Haven Express of Lock Haven, Pennsylvania
 Observer-Reporter of Washington, Pennsylvania
 Warren Times Observer of Warren, Pennsylvania
 Williamsport Sun-Gazette of Williamsport, Pennsylvania
 The Herald-Standard of Uniontown, Pennsylvania

Utah

 Daily Herald of Provo, Utah
 Standard-Examiner of Ogden, Utah
 Park Record of Park City, Utah

Virginia

 Northern Virginia Daily of Strasburg, Virginia
 Daily News-Record of Harrisonburg, Virginia
 Winchester Star of Winchester, Virginia

West Virginia

 The Inter-Mountain of Elkins, West Virginia
 The Journal of Martinsburg, West Virginia
 The Parkersburg News and Sentinel of Parkersburg, West Virginia
 Weirton Daily Times of Weirton, West Virginia
 Wheeling Intelligencer of Wheeling, West Virginia
 The Shepherdstown Chronicle of Shepherdstown, West Virginia
 The Wetzel Chronicle of New Martinsville, West Virginia
 The Tyler Star News'' of Sistersville, West Virginia

References 

1890 establishments in the United States
Companies based in West Virginia
Newspaper companies of the United States
Publishing companies established in 1890